Holcopasites calliopsidis is a species of cuckoo bee in the genus Holcopasites in the family Apidae. It is found in Central America and North America.

Hosts 
H. calliopsidis is a known cleptoparasite of Calliopsis andreniformis. Pseudopanurgus sp. may also be hosts of H. calliopsidis.

Subspecies
 Holcopasites calliopsidis calliopsidis (Linsley, 1943)
 Holcopasites calliopsidis carinatus (Linsley, 1943)

References

Further reading

 
 
 

Nomadinae
Insects described in 1943